K.O. Beast, known in Japan as , is an OVA, anime series.

History
In 1993-1994, Anime UK, a British-based magazine, brought the first three episodes to the UK market on its own label (this was Anime UK'''s only release). 

It was released in America by Right Stuf Inc. The American version made references to Pokémon due to the voice cast having also worked for the dub of Pokémon.

Story
The series is set in the distant future in which the Earth is split in two. The southern hemisphere is placed in another dimension while the inhabitants of the northern hemisphere are able to morph into beast-like humanoids. Eventually the humans of the southern hemisphere, led by Uranus, attack the Beasts.

The Three Beasts, Wan Derbard (Wan Dabadadatta) of the Tiger Tribe, Bud Mint (Baado Mint) of the Bird Tribe, and Mei Mer (Mei Mah) of the Mermaid Tribe, are taken prisoner along with Mei Mer's companion Tuttle Millen (Mekka Mannen, also of the Mermaid tribe), but manage to escape thanks to a little girl named Yuuni Charm Password. Together they seek Gaia, which they believe to be a fabulous treasure, but they are pursued by Uranus's minions : V-Darn the vicious mage-knight, V-Sion the warrior woman and Akumako, V-Darn's sadistic imp-like partner.

Characters
The series has three main characters: 
Wan - the male leader who dresses in red
Bud Mint - the male loner
Mei Mer - the female.

To these are added the child Yuni, who is female, and a bulky male Tuttle (so-written in the English subtitles) to complete a typical five-character adventure team. All but Yuni are "beasts" who usually appear in anthropomorphic form but who can easily shapeshift. For instance, when Wan becomes angry or sneezes, he turns into a tiger, though he still wears his trousers, as does Bud, who becomes a rooster when he is frightened or disgusted. Mei Mer's legs are replaced by a porpoise's tail; Tuttle becomes a sea turtle, his cumbersome body becoming an armored sphere. The first three are heroes of their tribes of beasts, each committed to protecting a magical statue of their tribe, which are called "Jinn." Each has a stereotypical childish desire:  Wan is hungry, Bud Mint wants girls, Mei Mer wants wealth. In addition, Bud often begins his responses with English expletives or sayings. The joke is that the symbol of the US is the eagle, but he is a chicken.

Their enemies are the human beings V-Darn and V-Sion, whose names involve a pun on the Japanese word for "beautiful," namely bi for v'', and the story begins with all heroes captured and taken to the enemy stronghold, and the three statues taken.

Voice cast

References

External links
 

1992 anime OVAs
1993 anime OVAs
Environmental television
Gainax
Mecha anime and manga
Post-apocalyptic anime and manga
Television series about shapeshifting